Zakhar Uladzimiravich Volkov (born 12 August 1997) is a Belarusian professional footballer who plays for BATE Borisov.

Club career
On 6 August 2020, the BFF banned Volkov from Belarusian football for 2 years for his involvement in the match fixing during his time in Naftan. The ban was later extended to all FIFA-approved competitions. In September 2021, the reminder 1 year of his suspension was indefinitely delayed by BFF and he was able to return on pitch in domestic competitions.

On 20 January 2022, he joined Russian Premier League club Khimki on loan until the end of the 2021–22 season.

Honours
BATE Borisov
Belarusian Premier League champion: 2018
Belarusian Cup winner: 2019–20

Career statistics

References

External links 
 
 
 

1997 births
Living people
Sportspeople from Vitebsk
Belarusian footballers
Association football midfielders
Belarus under-21 international footballers
Belarus international footballers
FC Vitebsk players
FC Orsha players
FC Naftan Novopolotsk players
FC BATE Borisov players
FC Khimki players
Belarusian First League players
Belarusian Premier League players
Russian Premier League players
Belarusian expatriate footballers
Expatriate footballers in Russia
Belarusian expatriate sportspeople in Russia